John Michael McConathy (born December 27, 1955) is an American former basketball coach and the winningest college basketball coach in Louisiana history. He served as the head men's basketball coach at Northwestern State University in Natchitoches, Louisiana from 1999 to 2022. He was raised in Bossier City and played college basketball at Louisiana Tech, earning honorable mention All-American honors. From 1983 to 1999, McConathy was the basketball coach at Bossier Parish Community College, originally an entity of the Bossier Parish School Board. He was hired as head coach at Northwestern State in March 1999.

He is the son of the late John McConathy, a former NBA player who was selected fifth overall in the 1951 NBA draft. John McConathy was a superintendent of the Bossier Parish School Board prior to his retirement in 1983.

Head coaching record

References

1955 births
Living people
American men's basketball coaches
American men's basketball players
Basketball coaches from Louisiana
Basketball players from Louisiana
Chicago Bulls draft picks
College men's basketball head coaches in the United States
Junior college men's basketball coaches in the United States
Louisiana Tech Bulldogs basketball players
Northwestern State Demons basketball coaches
Place of birth missing (living people)
People from Bossier City, Louisiana
People from Natchitoches, Louisiana